Captain Alexander Arthur Alfonso David Maule Ramsay of Mar DL (21 December 1919 – 20 December 2000) was the only child of Princess Patricia of Connaught, who renounced her royal title and style when she married then-Captain the Hon. Alexander Ramsay in February 1919. His mother was the youngest child of Prince Arthur, Duke of Connaught, the third son of Queen Victoria and Prince Albert. His father was the third son of John Ramsay, 13th Earl of Dalhousie.

Biography
Alexander Arthur Alfonso David Maule Ramsay was born on 21 December 1919 in his mother's bathroom at Clarence House, then the London residence of his maternal grandfather, the Duke of Connaught. His baptism was held on 23 February 1920 at the Chapel Royal at St James's Palace and attended by King George V and Queens Mary and Alexandra, Princess Louise, Duchess of Argyll, and Princess Victoria. His godparents were the Prince of Wales (later King Edward VIII), King Alfonso XIII of Spain, the Princess Royal, Princess Christian, Princess Helena Victoria, and Commander Bolton Eyres-Monsell.

He, along with his cousin Viscount Lascelles, acted as a page of honour during the coronation of King George VI and Queen Elizabeth. After leaving Eton College the same year, he received commission in the Grenadier Guards. Ramsay saw active service in North Africa during the Second World War. He lost his right leg during a tank battle in Tunisia in 1943. In 1944, he joined the staff of his cousin, the Duke of Gloucester, who was then Governor-General of Australia.

Upon returning to Britain in 1947, he was informed that he would inherit Mar Lodge and its estates from his aunt, Princess Alexandra, 2nd Duchess of Fife. In preparation for this role, he read agriculture at Trinity College, Oxford. After graduating in 1952, he worked for three years as assistant factor on the Linlithgow estates at South Queensferry. Ramsay inherited the Mar estate, becoming the new Laird of Mar, in 1959. At that point, Lord Lyon King of Arms allowed him to add the designation "of Mar" to his name. Part of the estate had to be sold to pay inheritance tax and became Mar Lodge Estate.

In 1956, Ramsay married Flora Fraser (born 18 October 1930), the only daughter of Alexander Fraser, 20th Lord Saltoun, and chief of the Name of Fraser. His wife succeeded her father as the 21st Lady Saltoun and chief of the Name of Fraser in 1979. Thereafter, they resided at his wife's family seat, Cairnbulg Castle at Fraserburgh, in Aberdeenshire. In 1971, he became the deputy lord lieutenant for Aberdeenshire.

Although the Ramsays of Mar had no royal titles and carried out no public duties, they attended most major royal events, and were the heads of many Scottish Feudal Baronies, including MacDuff, named for James Duff, 2nd Earl Fife. Alexander Ramsay of Mar died at his estate after a short illness, on the eve of his 81st birthday.

Family
Captain Alexander Ramsay of Mar and Lady Saltoun had three daughters:

 Hon. Katharine Fraser, Mistress of Saltoun (born 11 October 1957)
 Hon. Alice Elizabeth Margaret Ramsay of Mar (born 8 July 1961, Edinburgh). She married David Ramsey on 28 July 1990. They have four children:
Alexander Ramsey (b. 1991)
Victoria Ramsey (b. 1994)
George Ramsey (b. 28 September 1995)
Oliver Ramsey (b. 28 September 1995)
 Hon. Elizabeth Alexandra Mary Ramsay of Mar (born 15 April 1963, Inverness)

References

1919 births
2000 deaths
Alexander
People from the City of Westminster
People educated at Eton College
Alumni of Trinity College, Oxford
British Army personnel of World War II
Grenadier Guards officers
British amputees
Deputy Lieutenants of Aberdeenshire
Royalty and nobility with disabilities